Olovyanninsky District is an administrative and municipal district (raion), one of the thirty-one in Zabaykalsky Krai, Russia. It is located in the south of the krai, and borders with Baleysky District in the north, Borzinsky District in the south, and with Mogoytuysky District in the west. Its administrative center is the urban locality (an urban-type settlement) of Olovyannaya. Population:  49,426 (2002 Census);  The population of Olovyannaya accounts for 19.3% of the district's total population.

History
The district was established on January 4, 1926.

See also
Karaksar (air base)

References

Notes

Sources

Districts of Zabaykalsky Krai
States and territories established in 1926

